The Roanoke-Chowan Pork-Fest is an annual event held each May on the grounds of the Brady C. Jefcoat Museum in Murfreesboro, North Carolina.

Largely a barbecue cooking contest, funds from the event benefit the maintenance and operation of the Museum. In 2010, the first place prize was awarded as a tie for the first time to Fred Woodard of Smithfield, Virginia and J.W. Condon of Newport, North Carolina.

No event was held in 2020.

See also
Pig pickin'

References

Festivals in North Carolina
Food and drink festivals in the United States
Tourist attractions in Hertford County, North Carolina
Barbecue
Annual events in North Carolina
Murfreesboro, North Carolina